Singapore participated in the 2009 Southeast Asian Games which held in the city of Vientiane, Laos from 9 December 2009 to 18 December 2009.

The games' first gold medal was also won by the Singapore water polo team.

Expectations
Singapore entered the games with no official medal targets, but local media the Straits Times predicted 30 gold medals. The target is set lower than that for the previous games, as sports where Singapore traditionally does well, such as sailing, gymnastics and bowling were not featured in the games.

More specific targets were set by some sports, including swimming (11 golds), shooting (4 golds), football (1 gold), table tennis (7 golds) and water polo (1 gold). While no medals are expected, boxing, a sport Singapore is deputing in, aims to reach the semi-finals.

Medals

References

2009
Southeast Asian Games
Nations at the 2009 Southeast Asian Games